Muriel Santa Ana (born July 13, 1968) is an Argentine actress. She works in the TV series Solamente Vos.

Biography 
Santa Ana is the daughter of actor Walter Santa Ana and Mabel González; she also has a sister named Moira who is a singer and voice teacher. She completed her primary studies at the Escuela Úrsula Llames de Lapuente in Palermo, Ciudad de Buenos Aires, Argentina. Her parents separated when she turned 9, and both daughters went to live with their mother. A former student of the Escuela Normal Numero 6 de Palermo, Santa Ana attended high school with singer Érica García and actress Marcela Guerty. Long before deciding to be an actress, she studied flamenco, tango, flute, ceramics and Italian, and worked as an editor. At age 18 she began studying theater with Agustín Alezzo and then continued with other teachers such as Juan Carlos Gené, Rubén Szuchmacher, and Guillermo Angelelli.

Career 
Since 1995 she participated in plays, but it was in 2005 when she arrived on television, recommended by Luis Brandoni, playing the character of Venus in Una familia especial. In that program she met Mike Amigorena, who in 2006 invited her to join an experimental rock-pop theatrical music band, Ambulance, along with other actors such as Mariano Torre, Luciano Bonanno, Julián Vilar and Víctor Malagrino to later transform into an Orchestra-show by Sergio D'Angelo. Then would come Juanita, la soltera. That year she also participated in the telenovela Lalola  playing the character of Graciela, which earned her public recognition and for which her obtained her first nomination for Martín Fierro Awards in 2007. In 2009 she was summoned by the director Juan Taratuto to be the protagonist of the telenovela Ciega a citas, based on a blog by Carolina Aguirre, with the character of Lucía González, a journalist who will have 258 days, until the date on which her sister will marry to find a boyfriend to suit her and thus be able to take revenge on her mother.

Filmography

Theater

Television

Movies

Awards and nominations

References

External links
 

Argentine actresses
People from Buenos Aires
1970 births
Living people